Patricia Pepper also called Pat Pepper (1936 - 25 July 2006) was a British road cyclist. She competed seven times at UCI Road World Championships between 1962 and 1970, with her best result a 5th place in the 1963 UCI Road World Championships. She won medals at the British National Road Race Championships, placing 2nd in 1962, 1963, 1964 and placing 3rd in 1967, 1969, and 1972.

Pepper continued with competitive cycling as a master. In July 2006 she crashed during a competition on the road in Cambridge, and died a week later at the age of 70.

Achievements
1960 
3rd in British Best All Rounder, (London (F) (c)), London (Greater London), Great Britain 

1962 
2nd in National Championship, Road, Elite, Great Britain (F), Great Britain 
3rd in British Best All Rounder, (London (F) (c)), London (Greater London), Great Britain 

1963 
2nd in National Championship, Road, Elite, Great Britain (F), Great Britain 
3rd in British Best All Rounder, (London (F) (c)), London (Greater London), Great Britain 

1964 
5th in National Championship, Road, ITT, Elite, Great Britain (F), Kidlington (Oxfordshire), Great Britain 
2nd in British Best All Rounder, (London (F) (c)), London (Greater London), Great Britain 

1965 
1st in Teplice Criterium, (Teplice (F)), Teplice (Ustecky Kraj), Czech Republic 
2nd in Newbury R.C. Road Race, (Newbury (F) (a)), Newbury (Berkshire), Great Britain 

1967 
3rd in National Championship, Road, Elite, Great Britain (F), Great Britain 

1969 
3rd in National Championship, Road, Elite, Great Britain (F), Great Britain 

1971 
5th in part a Gemini B.C. Footscray Meadows Cyclo Cross, (Foots Cray, Cyclo-cross), Sidcup (Bexley), Great Britain 
9th in part b Gemini B.C. Footscray Meadows Cyclo Cross, (Foots Cray, Cyclo-cross), Sidcup (Bexley), Great Britain 

1972 
3rd in National Championship, Road, Elite, Great Britain (F), Great Britain 

1976 
7th in part c London International Weekend, (London (F) (a)), Stratford (Greater London), Great Britain 
7th in General Classification London International Weekend, (London (F) (a)), Stratford (Greater London), Great Britain 
7th in National Championship, Road, Elite, Great Britain (F), Harrogate (North Yorkshire), Great Britain

References

See also
List of racing cyclists and pacemakers with a cycling-related death 

1936 births
2006 deaths
British female cyclists
People from Colchester
20th-century British women